Pettilambattra is a 2018 Indian Malayalam-language film written and directed by Syam Lenin. It is a comedy drama film that narrates the story of four men living in a small town in Kerala, India. The film was released on 29 June 2018.

Cast
 Indrans as Ramettan
 Irshad as S.I.Rameshan
 Levin Simon Joseph as Kidu
 Sanmayanandan as Kathappan
 Jenson Alappat as Pragini
 Roni raj as Swami
 Sivadas madampalli as Sivan
 Ullas panthalam as Sugunan
 Chembil ashokan as Mash
 Paravoor Vasanthi as Kathappan mother
 Sabitha Nair as Sulu
 Neha krishnanan as Swayam/ Swayamprabha
 Mary as Mary
 Anitha nair as Anitha
 Arathi krishna as Arathi
 Sharikha as Reena

References

External links
 

2018 films
2010s Malayalam-language films
Indian comedy-drama films